Sveta Nedelja (also Santa Domenica d'Albona; takes its name from Saint Kyriake = Sancta Dominica) is a municipality of twenty villages in Croatia, total population 2,987 (2011). The three largest villages are municipal seat Nedešćina (604), Štrmac (439) and Šumber (village with castle, 381).

List of villages
The municipality has 21 villages:

Demography

Municipality Sveta Nedelja 

Note: Emerged from old Labin municipality. In 1857, 1869, 1921 and 1931 contains part of the data of the town Labin and municipality Raša, while in 1880 only of town Labin. In 1857, 1869, 1921 and 1931 part of the data is contained in municipality Kršan and Raša.

References

External links
 Official site

Municipalities of Croatia
Populated places in Istria County